İlxıçı (also, Ilxıçı, Ilkhychi, and Ilkhychy) is a village and municipality in the Agsu Rayon of Azerbaijan.  It has a population of 781.

References 

Populated places in Agsu District